The 1947–48 Cypriot Cup was the 11th edition of the Cypriot Cup. A total of 5 clubs entered the competition. It began on 18 January 1948 with the quarterfinals and concluded on 1 February 1947 with the final which was held at GSP Stadium. AEL won their 3rd Cypriot Cup trophy after beating APOEL 2–0 in the final.

Format 
In the 1947–48 Cypriot Cup, participated all the teams of the Cypriot First Division.

The competition consisted of three knock-out rounds. In all rounds each tie was played as a single leg and was held at the home ground of the one of the two teams, according to the draw results. Each tie winner was qualifying to the next round. If a match was drawn, extra time was following. If extra time was drawn, there was a replay match.

Quarter-finals

Semi-finals

Final

Sources

Bibliography

See also 
 Cypriot Cup
 1947–48 Cypriot First Division

Cypriot Cup seasons
1947–48 domestic association football cups
1947–48 in Cypriot football